Oleksandra Kovalenko (born 2 May 2001) is a Ukrainian synchronised swimmer. She is European Championships medalist.

References

2001 births
Living people
Ukrainian synchronized swimmers
World Aquatics Championships medalists in synchronised swimming
European Aquatics Championships medalists in synchronised swimming
European Championships (multi-sport event) silver medalists
Sportspeople from Kharkiv
21st-century Ukrainian women